H. S. Shivashankar is an Indian politician from the state of Karnataka. He is a member of the Karnataka Legislative Assembly.

Constituency
He represents the Harihar constituency.

Political Party
He is from the Janata Dal (Secular).

External links 
 Karnataka Legislative Assembly

References 

Living people
Karnataka MLAs 2013–2018
Janata Dal (Secular) politicians
Year of birth missing (living people)